Best Friends Forever is a 2013 American female buddy road comedy film directed by Brea Grant and written and starring Brea Grant and Vera Miao. The film premiered at the 2013 Slamdance Film Festival.

Plot
Harriet and Reba take their '76 AMC Pacer on the open road and instead get a wild ride towards an impending nuclear holocaust in downtown Los Angeles.

Cast
Brea Grant as Harriet
Vera Miao as Reba
Glen Powell as Nick
Tamara Rey as Olivia
Constance Wu as Melanie
Sean Maher as Sean
Sean Riggs as Chris
Mylinda Royer as Lesly
Stacey Storey as Amanda
Kit Williamson as Kit
Tom Fox Davies as Sebastian
Ben Hethcoat as Kyle
Riccardo LeBron as Austinite
Grace Yang Vitali as Reba's mom
Christopher Jon Martin as sheriff
Stevin Espinoza as Mattias
Nora Nagatani as woman
Leslie Chappell as woman
Alex Berg as Alex 1
Alex Fernie as Alex 2

Reception
On review aggregator website Rotten Tomatoes the film has a score of 50% based on reviews from 6 critics, with an average rating of 4.5/10.

John DeFore of The Hollywood Reporter wrote "The destruction of Los Angeles isn't enough to enliven this muddled road movie".

References

External links

 
 
 

2013 comedy films
2010s comedy road movies
American comedy road movies
American female buddy films
Films set in Los Angeles
2010s female buddy films
2010s English-language films
2010s American films